Aiken's Hotel in Eagle, Idaho, also known as Eagle Hotel, is a two-story concrete block building constructed in 1910. The hotel features design elements of Colonial Revival architecture, but it has been considered an Italianate structure. The hotel was designed with 16 rooms large enough to accommodate residential customers. It was added to the United States National Register of Historic Places in 1982.

Thomas H. Aiken, also known as Thomas H. Aikens, arrived in Idaho Territory in 1871. His brother, Samuel D. Aiken, owner of the Green Meadow Ranch, arrived in 1862. In 1877, Thomas Aiken secured water rights to property on Eagle Island. By the 1890s, Aiken promoted and finally secured construction of a bridge across the Boise River, and he increased his land holdings on Eagle Island. Aiken platted the town of Eagle in 1904.

The interurban trolley line opened on the island in 1907.

References

External links

Further reading
 Possible Eagle Register of Historic Sites, City of Eagle
 Eagle (Arcadia Publishing, 2012), pp 25

		
National Register of Historic Places in Ada County, Idaho
Commercial buildings completed in 1910